WJOT (1510 AM) is a radio station licensed to Wabash, Indiana broadcasting an oldies format. The station is owned by Dream Weaver Marketing, LLC. The station simulcasts WJOT-FM 105.9 Wabash.

History
The station began broadcasting in November 1971 and held the call sign WAYT. The station aired a MOR format. By 1988, the station was airing a country music format. By 1992, the station was airing an adult contemporary/country format. In July 1998, the station's call sign was changed to WJOT and the station adopted an oldies format.

References

External links
WJOT's official website

JOT
Oldies radio stations in the United States
Radio stations established in 1971
1971 establishments in Indiana
JOT